"Move On" is the third Japanese single from Rain.

Music video
Rain is shown first sitting in an armchair in a dark room that resembles an apartment and singing. Then he gets up towards the end of the music video and starts walking around the building that he is in, dancing and singing at the same time.

Track listing
Disk 1
 Move On
 Up in the Club
 Move On (instrumental)
 Up in the Club (instrumental)

DVD
 "Move On" PV
 "Move On" PV Making
 Interview

Charts

Sales: 10,584

References

External links
 Rain - Official English website 

2006 singles
Rain (entertainer) songs
Korean-language songs
2006 songs
King Records (Japan) singles